Jon Robyns (born 8 December 1982) is a British stage actor, who is best known for playing the roles of Princeton and Rod in Avenue Q the musical and Jean Valjean in Les Misérables in London's West End.

Early life
Robyns was born in Manchester and grew up in Liverpool, England.  Moving to Bristol at the age of 10 he became involved with several local theatre and youth music groups. Performing in such varied shows as Purcell's Dido and Aeneas and Handel's Messiah to Kander and Ebb's classic musical Cabaret. He worked on new material with Playbox Theatre Company performing NEWS and performed two new operas with MusicBox Youth Opera; Fox at the manger and Brundibar.

In 1999 Robyns moved to Cardiff becoming involved with Welsh National Youth Opera. With WNYO he performed The Beggar's Opera, The Elixir of Love and Dido and Aeneas (again). Robyns was also part of Black Mountain Male Voice Choir – the official Choir of the 1999 Rugby World Cup, singing at Wales games and the opening and closing ceremonies at Cardiffs Millennium Stadium. With his friends, Robyns ran a weekly drama group and worked on a production of Berkovs West whilst studying Music, Theatre Studies and Sociology A Level.

During this time Robyns was part of the National Youth Choir of Great Britain singing in venues around the country including Walton's Belshazars Feast at the Millennium Proms at the Royal Albert Hall.

Robyns is a supporter of Liverpool FC

Training
In 2001 Robyns attended the 3-year Musical Theatre course at Mountview Academy of Theatre Arts in London. During his final year Robyns played Sweeney Todd in Stephen Sondheim's masterpiece musical. Other roles at drama school include Teddy in Harold Pinter's The Homecoming, Banquo in Macbeth and Jesus in Godspell.

Career
Graduating in 2004 Robyns joined the UK touring company of Miss Saigon understudying the role Chris and playing the part on many occasions. After this he played the role of Mark Cohen in Rent with The English Theatre, Frankfurt, Germany. In June 2006 Robyns played the roles of Princeton and Rod in the original London cast of Avenue Q the musical in London's West End. He left the show in December 2007.  Robyns was part of the company for the concert version of Chess at the Royal Albert Hall on 12 and 13 May 2008.

Robyns played the role of Marius Pontmercy in Les Misérables at the Queen's Theatre until leaving the show on 23 June 2009. He has rejoined the cast of Les Misérables during the 25th Anniversary International Tour as Enjolras and is on the live recording Album. Robyns appeared at the O2 Arena on 3 October alongside current/previous cast members from across the world in a 25th Anniversary concert.

In 2008 Robyns recorded a song for the CD Act One – Songs From The Musicals Of Alexander S. Bermange, an album of 20 brand new recordings by 26 West End stars, released in November 2008 on Dress Circle Records, and recorded the role of robot ThreeSix in a concept album of Laurence Mark Wythe's musical The Lost Christmas. He has previously recorded material for Whyte and in 2005 appeared in a showcase of one of the composer's musicals at Greenwich Theatre.

In 2011 Robyns joined the cast of Spamalot as part of the UK Tour, performing the role of Sir Galahad. The show toured the UK throughout 2012, before a return to the West End at the Harold Pinter Theatre.

In 2014 Robyns joined the original London cast of Memphis, playing the role of first cover Huey.

In 2015, starred as Caractacus Potts in the musical Chitty Chitty Bang Bang at the West Yorkshire Playhouse (now named the Leeds Playhouse). The role was latterly taken by larger-profile performers on the subsequent UK Tour, including Jason Manford and Lee Mead.

In 2016 Robyns played Emmett Forrest in the Leicester Curve production of Legally Blonde, and performed in both the UK tour of Sister Act as Eddie and The Wedding Singer as Robbie Hart.

In 2018 Robyns joined the West End cast of Hamilton at the Victoria Palace theatre playing King George III.

In December 2019, Robyns took over the role of Jean Valjean in the new production of Les Misérables at the Sondheim Theatre (formerly The Queens). The production was closed in March 2020 due to the COVID-19 pandemic. Robyns, along with Dean Chisnall (whom, until January 14th 2023, performed as Jean Valjean on the UK/Ireland tour), reprised the role of Jean Valjean in the staged concert version of the show, opening in May 2021.

In 2021, Robyns was cast as Valjean when the Sondheim reopened. On February 28, 2023, it was announced that the matinee and evening shows of that day would be his last as Valjean, before he left Les Mis.

On 18th January 2023, it was announced that Robyns was cast as The Phantom in Andrew Lloyd Webber's The Phantom of the Opera, taking over the role from Killian Donnelly and Earl Carpenter.

Theatre credits

References

External links
 Jon Robyns' Official Homepage
 Avenue Q
Official Memphis

1982 births
Living people
Alumni of the Mountview Academy of Theatre Arts
English male musical theatre actors